Meow Mix is a variety of dry and wet cat food known for its advertising jingle.  It is a product of The J.M. Smucker Company as of March 23, 2015. Meow Mix was introduced in 1974 and sells many flavors, including Original Choice and Seafood Medley, among many others. It also is known for selling Alley Cat dry cat food. Their current slogan is "it's the only brand cats ask for by name."

Overview 
The Meow Mix Company operates from a  facility in Decatur, Alabama and produces Alley Cat brand cat food products.  Originally a product of Ralston Purina, Meow Mix was divested for antitrust reasons in the early 2000s. The brand was acquired by Del Monte Foods in May, 2006. Their most famous slogan is, "Tastes so good, cats ask for it by name."
The company was acquired by Cypress Group, a New York-based private equity firm in a $425 million leveraged buyout in 2003.  Three years later, Del Monte Foods acquired the company for $705 million.  The company had also been owned by J.W. Childs Associates which acquired the business in 2001 for $160 million.  On March 23, 2015, parent company Big Heart Pet Brands was acquired by The J.M. Smucker Company for $5.8 billion.

Jingles
"The Meow Mix Theme" was written by Shelly Palmer in 1970. The idea came from Ron Travisano, at the advertising agency of Della Femina Travisano and Partners, who had the account with Ralston Purina in 1974. The first TV spot aired in 1974, and consisted of animals walking across the screen. Travisano put together film footage with editor Jay Gold, looping images of a cat to make it look like it was singing. The music was then composed by Tom McFaul of the jingle house Lucas/McFaul, one of the major jingle-composing houses at the time. Working from Travisano's film, McFaul wrote and produced music to fit, with the actual meowing performed by professional singer Linda November. Travisano then came up with the idea of adding English "translation" subtitles, along with a bouncing ball pointing out the words, which often reflected the specific flavor(s) of Meow Mix product being advertised and changed from commercial to commercial. The song was used by the CIA during the War on Terror to torture captives.

Products
The brand includes a variety of dry cat foods, wet foods, and treats, including the new Meow-Mix Tender Centers cat food.

Meow Mix House
Meow Mix House was a reality TV show created by Meow Mix and hosted by Tom Shillue in the format of Survivor.  Ten cats rescued from animal shelters nationwide (including the ASPCA in New York, Touched by an Animal in Chicago, and Kitten Rescue in Los Angeles) competed for a grand prize — an executive-level position with the Meow Mix Company.  These three-minute reality TV segments aired on Animal Planet for ten consecutive weeks, beginning on June 16, 2006.  The cats were viewable full-time via webcam and were adopted as they were voted off of the show, receiving a year's supply of Meow Mix as a consolation prize.  Weekly contest winners for areas such as "Best Purr" and "Greatest Post Climber" were decided by a panel of judges.  Two winners were chosen — one through professional judges, and a second by television viewers.  The company stated that the winner received the title of Meow Mix's "feline vice president of research," as well as becoming part of a new family.  A second corporate position was provided to the cat voted most popular by viewers.

Miami's Cisco won the top prize of vice-president of research and development at Meow Mix, and Ellis from Portland was "viewers' choice" winner.

Varieties
Meow Mix comes in many varieties, including Meow Mix Original Choice, Meow Mix Seafood Selections, Meow Mix Indoor Formula, Meow Mix Tender Centers and the now discontinued Meow Mix Market Select which was intended to compete against Fancy Feast.

Ingredients

Note: ingredient list for Meow Mix Original Choice Dry Cat Food

Ground Yellow Corn, Corn Gluten Meal, Chicken By-Product Meal, Soybean Meal, Beef Tallow Preserved with Mixed-Tocopherols (Source of Vitamin E), Turkey By-Product Meal, Salmon Meal, Oceanfish Meal, Brewers Dried Yeast, Phosphoric Acid, Animal Digest, Calcium Carbonate, Potassium Chloride, Tetra Sodium Pyrophosphate, Calcium Chloride, Choline Chloride, Added Color (Red 40, Yellow 5, Blue 2 and other colors), Salt, Taurine, Zinc Sulfate, Ferrous Sulfate, L-alanine, Niacin, Vitamin Supplements

See also
 Think Like a Cat
 Purina
 Whiskas

References

External links
 

Cat food brands
Animal food manufacturers
Manufacturing companies based in Alabama
Products introduced in 1974
Ralston Purina products
Del Monte Foods brands
1974 establishments in Alabama
Private equity portfolio companies
The J.M. Smucker Co. brands